Soroda Estate present day Sorada or Surada, was a zamindari in the North-Western side of Ganjam district of Odisha, India.

The Soroda dynasty originates from the Khidisingi clan who were the descendants of the Nala dynasty of the Kalinga region. They are contemporary to Raja Mukunda Dev-I of Puri and the same is reflected in all the 24 volumes of Raja Mukunda Dev of Puri.

According to the Census Report of T.J. Maltobi of 1880, the Khidisingi Estate was established in 1168 by Raja Sobha Chandra Singh of Sabeijaipur. He was crowned by the Tribal Chief Pattamalik (Last Kandha king of Khidisingi) and his four sons on the order of Goddess Barahi. The Khidisingi estate was bounded by Hinjalak (Hinjilicut) in the east, Kalahandi State, Jeypore Estate and Gadapur (Kandhamal district) in the west, Khimandi (Badakhemundi Estate) in the south and Ghumusar in the north. They were devotees of Goddess Khambeswari or Stambeswari. Goddess Kandhuni Devi is one of the Chata Khamba. Their Gotra is Parasara.

Rajas of Khidisingi 
 Bera Patta Mallik (Last Kandha king)
 Raja Sobha Chandra Singh (Nala dynasty descendant)
 Raja Purusottama Singh
 Raja Krushna Singh
 Raja Rai Singh
 Raja Preeti Singh
 Raja Kirti Singh
 Raja Padmanabha Singh
 Raja Bikram Singh
 Raja Baliar Singh (Last Khidisingi king)

In 1476, Raja Baliar Singh divided the Khidisingi (Sorada) kingdom into four different states due to early demise of his elder son. Sorada went to his second son, Raja Sandhadhanu Singh.

Badagada – Raja Daman Singh (Baliar Singh's grandson from his eldest son)
Sorada – Raja Sandhadhanu Singh (also known as Abhaya Pratap)
Dharakote – Raja Hadu Singh
Sheragada – Raja Parsuram Singh (Minor) (Represented by Raja Baliar himself).

Soroda Dynasty 

The Soroda estate was ruled by Raja Sandhadhanu Singh, his son Raja Shyam Sunder Singh and Raja Kunja Singh peacefully and without much trouble. Raja Kunja Singh accepted the British rule along with other princely states of Ganjam and Orissa. In 1830, Raja Janardhan Singh succeeded to the throne of Soroda. He was a tyrannical king and also a revolutionary ruler. He refused to pay cess and duties to the Britishers and as a result of that the Soroda estate was auctioned by the Britishers on 09.12.1833 and the king of Ghumusar auctioned it. Raja Janardan Singh organized the tribals of Khidisingi and revolted against the Britishers staying at the hilltop of Chakunda forest of Badagada. The Britishers compelled Raja Raghunath Singh of Badagada and arrested Raja Janardan Singh. Raja Janardan Singh and his son Yubraj Sunder Singh Deo again organized the tribels and fought with the king of Ghumusar to take revenge and become successful in their mission. At this instances the Britishers were compelled to grant the inam villages of Sundarrajpur(Lanjipally), Pitala and Dhobadi to  Raja Janardan Singh and his son Yubraj Sunder Singh Deo. Raja Sunder Singh Deo was a peace-loving king and preferred to stay in Sundarrajpur (Lanjipally). Raja Sobha Chandra Singh Deo, son of Raja Sunder Singh Deo continued to rule Soroda in exile. The system was discontinued for some time and the rituals were continued by the freedom fighter and social activist Jagannath Singh Deo at the instances of Great freedom fighter Sashi Bhusan Rath and others and is being continued by his son Dr. Debadutta Singh Deo.

References 

Dynasties of India
Ganjam district